Jean-Joseph Perraud (26 April 1819, Jura - 2 November 1876) was a French academic sculptor. According to Eaton, "During the Second Empire no sculptor enjoyed a greater reputation", although his style fell out of fashion soon after his death.

Biography
Perraud was a student at the École des Beaux-Arts from 1843 under Etienne-Jules Ramey and Augustin-Alexandre Dumont, co-winner of the Prix de Rome in 1847, officer in the Legion of Honor in 1867, and member of the Académie des Beaux-Arts.

Perraud died in Paris.  He is buried in Montparnasse Cemetery.

Major works
Télémaque apportant à Phalante l'urne renfermant les cendres d'Hippias (based on Fénelon's The Adventures of Telemachus)
 Childhood of Bacchus from 1863 and now at the Louvre
 figure of Jérôme Lalande, facade of the Louvre
 Lyrical Drama figural group on the facade of the Palais Garnier, 1865–69
 figure of Berlin on the facade of the Gare du Nord
 Despair, at the Musée d'Orsay, 1869
 statue of Saint Denis, at the Church of St Vaast, Arras, Pas-de-Calais

References 

 Daniel Cady Eaton, A Handbook of Modern French Sculpture, Dodd, Mead and Company, 1913

External links
 

Prix de Rome for sculpture
French architectural sculptors
1819 births
1876 deaths
Members of the Académie des beaux-arts
Officiers of the Légion d'honneur
19th-century French sculptors
French male sculptors
19th-century French male artists